The International Electrotechnical Commission (IEC) is a standards-making body in the field of electrical and electronics technologies. The IEC works with National Committees in different countries in preparing and maintaining standards in this space. IEC is one of the oldest standards making bodies in existence.

Standards
The IEC standards making process, similar to many other standards making processes, is handled by various technical committees (TC) and subcommittees (SC). TCs report to the SMB (Standardization Management Board). Each TC defines its scope (or area of activity) which is submitted to the SMB for approval. Any TC can form one or more SCs depending on the extent of its work programme. SCs define their scope under the parent TC to which they report directly.

TC membership is composed of the IEC NCs (National Committees), all of which are free to take part in the work of any given TC.

IEC has more than  technical experts working on standards voluntarily.

This list is intended to detail the various technical committees of IEC, the scope of the committees, their key members and the key relevance and outputs of these committees.

Each technical committee and its standardization efforts is vast and is carried out by various working groups within the technical committees.

IEC technical committees and subcommittees

See also
 List of ISO standards
 List of IEC standards
 List of EN standards
 International Classification for Standards
 Standardization

References

External links 
 IEC List of technical committees and subcommittees
 IEC Website